The University Athletic Association of the Philippines Chess tournament is held yearly by the UAAP.

UAAP Chess Champions
Note: This list is incomplete

External links
UAAP Championship Scoreboard (List of Champions of all UAAP sports until 1998-99) 
UE, UST chessers near UAAP crowns.(Sports News)
UAAP Roundup; UE wins 4th straight juniors chess crown.(Sports)
With 4 titles, La Salle leads race for UAAP overall title (October 15, 2003)
UAAP General Championship; La Salle, UST in tight race.(Sports) (October 19, 2004)
Gomez's MVP- form leads La Salle to sixth straight UAAP chess men's crown (September 19, 2004)
PinoyExchange.com - UAAP 63 Juniors Chess

Chess
Chess competitions